Latania, commonly known as latan palm or latania palm, is a genus of flowering plant in the palm tree family, native to the Mascarene Islands in the western Indian Ocean.

Species
The genus contains three species, one from each of the three major islands (including islets) in the chain. All species have been ranked as Endangered by the IUCN.

Latan palms are large, single-stemmed fan palms with separate male and female plants (dioecy); when the leaves fall, they leave scars on the trunks. Male flowers are small, in clusters, and emerge from within leathery bracts on the catkin-like inflorescences. Female flowers are larger, solitary and not concealed within bracts. The fruits contain 1-3 pyrenes, which are seeds enclosed within woody endocarps. The endocarps have sculpted surfaces and the three species are readily distinguished from their pyrenes.

References

External links

 
Flora of the Western Indian Ocean
Arecaceae genera
Taxonomy articles created by Polbot
Endemic flora of the Mascarene Islands